Wahler is a German surname. Notable people with the surname include:

Bernd Wahler (born 1958), German businessman 
:de:Franz Wahler (born 1962), Austrian bridge engineer
Georges Wahler (1933—2008), French sports shooter
:de:Hans Hermann Wahler (1909–1984), Hessian politician (FDP)
Jim Wahler (born 1966), American football defensive lineman
Marc-Olivier Wahler (born 1964), Swiss art curator, critic and historian

See also 
Freie Wähler, the German Free Voters Associations

German-language surnames
Surnames from given names